Plate of Origin (abbreviated as POO) was an Australian competitive cooking game show that was broadcast on the Seven Network. Celebrity chef Manu Feildel hosts the series alongside former MasterChef Australia judges chef Gary Mehigan and food critic Matt Preston. The series is described as "The World Cup of Cooking" or "Country of Origin on a Plate"', with teams competing by cooking international food cuisines.

The series was originally conceived and marketed as a spin-off edition of successful cooking game show My Kitchen Rules but was later developed as a separate program. It was originally scheduled to air following the 2020 Summer Olympics, but was slightly delayed due to the postponement of the Olympic Games because of the COVID-19 pandemic. The pandemic also impacted production, resulting in a lower than expected number of episodes being completed.

The series aired over four weeks, which began on Sunday, 30 August 2020 at 7:00pm. The series finale aired on Tuesday, 22 September 2020. Despite elevated expectations and the high profile of the judges, the series was a ratings disappointment. Seven did not renew the show for a second series.

Teams

List of the ten competing teams.

Elimination history

Competition details

Head-to-Head

During this round, two teams will compete head-to-head with each team both delivering a two-course dinner for the judges consisting of a main and dessert, they are then scored on both dishes by each three judges with the lower scoring team sent to an elimination challenge.

Australia vs China
 Episode 1
 Airdate — 30 August

Greece vs France
 Episode 2
 Airdate — 31 August

Cameroon vs Vietnam
 Episode 3
 Airdate — 1 September

India vs Lebanon
 Episode 4
 Airdate — 6 September

Italy vs Venezuela
 Episode 5
 Airdate — 7 September

Elimination Challenge

The five losing teams from the head-to-head rounds will face off in the elimination challenge where they will be tasked to create an Australian classic, the Meat pie, using the flavours of their nation. The team with the worst dish is eliminated. Two teams who each had the secondary worst dishes are both sent to a second round where they must each create a tart, the team with the worst dish from this round is also eliminated.

 Episode 6
 Airdate — 8 September

Quarter-finals

Round 1

 Episode 7
 Airdate — 14 September 
 Description - The first four of eight remaining teams enter the quarter-finals Fast and Furious round. Two teams go head-to-head to cook a chicken dish that celebrates a true taste of their cuisine in just 45 minutes. At the end of each round, two teams will be eliminated and two teams will go to the Semi-finals.

Round 2

 Episode 8
 Airdate — 15 September 
 Description - The remaining four of eight teams enter the quarter-finals Fast and Furious round. Two teams go head-to-head to cook a beef dish that celebrates a true taste of their cuisine in just 45 minutes. At the end of each round, two teams will be eliminated and two teams will go to the Grand Final

Finals

Semi-finals

 Episode 9 
 Airdate — 22 September 
 Description - The four remaining teams face off in the semi-final over two rounds. The first round all teams will be tasked to create an classic dish using the flavours of their nation. The team with the best dish will be fast tracked to the Grand Final while the team with the worst dish is eliminated. In the second round, the remaining two teams must each create a dessert, the team with the best dish will go through to the Grand Final also the team with the worst dish is eliminated.

Grand Final

 Episode 10
 Airdate — 22 September 
 Description - After two teams are eliminated in the semi-final, the succeeding two teams must cook an epic three courses – entrée, main and dessert – each to be judged and scored with the highest scoring team crowned the Plate of Origin champions and receive $100,000.

Ratings

See also 
 My Kitchen Rules
 Family Food Fight
 MasterChef Australia
 The Hotplate

References

External links 
 

Seven Network original programming
2020 Australian television series debuts
2020 Australian television series endings
2020s Australian reality television series
Australian cooking television series
Cooking competitions in Australia
Food reality television series
English-language television shows
Television shows set in Sydney
Television series by Seven Productions